Futrono (from the Mapudungun: Futronhue, meaning "place of smoke") is a city and commune in southern Chile administered by the Municipality of Futrono. It is located in Ranco Province in Los Ríos Region, on the northwest shore of Ranco Lake.

Demographics
Of these, 8,399 (56.1%) lived in urban areas and 6,582 (43.9%) in rural areas. The population grew by 6.6% (933 persons) between the 1992 and 2002 censuses.

Administration
As a commune, Futrono is a third-level administrative division of Chile administered by a municipal council, headed by an alcalde who is directly elected every four years. The 2008-2012 alcalde is Jorge Guillermo Tatter Oñate (UDI).

Within the electoral divisions of Chile, Futrono is represented in the Chamber of Deputies by Enrique Jaramillo  (PDC) and Gastón Von Mühlenbrock (UDI) as part of the 54th electoral district, together with Panguipulli, Los Lagos, Lago Ranco, Río Bueno, La Unión and Paillaco.

References

External links

  Municipality of Futrono
  Chamber of Tourism Futrono

Populated places in Ranco Province
Communes of Chile
Populated places established in 1941
Populated lakeshore places in Chile